is a city located in Ibaraki Prefecture, Japan. , the city had an estimated population of 48,776 in 18,311 households and a population density of 337 persons per km². The percentage of the population aged over 65 was 30.0%.

The city has two mosques.

Geography
Omitama is located in central Ibaraki Prefecture, in the low-lying flatlands north of Lake Kasumigaura.

Surrounding municipalities
Ibaraki Prefecture
 Ishioka
 Namegata
 Hokota
 Kasama
 Ibaraki

Climate
Omitama has a Humid continental climate (Köppen Cfa) characterized by warm summers and cool winters with light snowfall.  The average annual temperature in Omitama is 13.7 °C. The average annual rainfall is 1357 mm with September as the wettest month. The temperatures are highest on average in August, at around 25.6 °C, and lowest in January, at around 2.8 °C.

Demographics
Per Japanese census data, the population of Omitama peaked around the year 2000 and has declined slightly since.

History
The city of Omitama was established on March 27, 2006, from the merger of the towns of Ogawa and Minori (both from Higashiibaraki District), and the village of Tamari (from Niihari District). The new city took its name from portions of the three older town and village names from which it was formed, Ogawa, Minori, Tamari.

Government
Omitama has a mayor-council form of government with a directly elected mayor and a unicameral city council of 20 members. Omitama contributes one member to the Ibaraki Prefectural Assembly. In terms of national politics, the city is part of Ibaraki 2nd district of the lower house of the Diet of Japan.

Economy
Agriculture is the mainstay of the local economy, with cash crops including chives, strawberries, melons, rice and lotus roots.

Omitama is also the home of Ibaraki Airport, which opened in March 2010 after consideable public investment.  Its original intention was to attarct Low Cost Carriers to an operating centre North of Tokyo. To dat it has had some suucess by atrracting Skymark Airlines, Spring Airlines and TigerAir to offer limited domestic and international routes to Xian, Taipei and Shanghai

Education
Omitama has 11 public elementary schools and four public middle schools operated by the city government, and one public high school operated by the Ibaraki Prefectural Board of Education.

Transportation

Railway
 JR East – Jōban Line

Highway
  – Minori Parking Area

Airport
Ibaraki Airport

Military facilities
Hyakuri Air Base, a Japan Air Self-Defense Force base.

Sister city relations
  Abilene, Kansas, USA

Local attractions

Noted people from Omitama
Yuya Niwa, politician
Jun Yanagisawa, professional football player

References

External links

Official Website 

Cities in Ibaraki Prefecture
Omitama